Heartbeat (Italian: Batticuore) is a 1939 Italian "white-telephones" comedy film directed by Mario Camerini and starring Assia Noris, John Lodge and Rubi D'Alma. It remade in France as Beating Heart in 1940, and then again in Hollywood as a 1946 film of the same title starring Ginger Rogers and Basil Rathbone.

It was shot at the Cinecittà Studios in Rome. The film's sets were designed by the art director Gastone Medin. It is part of the tradition of White Telephone comedies.

Synopsis
In Paris a young woman working at a school for thieves attempts to pick the pocket of an aristocrat. Instead of turning her in he blackmails her into stealing a clock from an ambassador.

Cast

References

Bibliography 
 Ricci, Steven. Cinema and Fascism: Italian Film and Society, 1922–1943. University of California Press, 2008.

External links 
 

1939 films
Italian comedy films
1939 comedy films
1930s Italian-language films
Films directed by Mario Camerini
Italian black-and-white films
Films shot at Cinecittà Studios
Films set in Paris
1930s Italian films